East Columbia may refer to:
 East Columbia Historic District (Farmington, Missouri)
 East Columbia, Portland, Oregon
 East Columbia, Texas